Bob Mercer is a Canadian former politician. He represented the riding of Humber East in the Newfoundland and Labrador House of Assembly from 1996 to 2003. He was a member of the Liberals.

Prior to his election to the House of Assembly, Mercer served as mayor of Pasadena from 1993 to 1996. He subsequently served a second term as mayor from 2005 to 2009.

References

Liberal Party of Newfoundland and Labrador MHAs
Mayors of places in Newfoundland and Labrador
Year of birth missing (living people)
Living people
People from Newfoundland (island)
21st-century Canadian politicians